This article describes the composition and actions of the Argentine naval forces in the Falklands War. For a list of naval forces from the United Kingdom, see British naval forces in the Falklands War.

Background
The Argentine Navy (ARA), particularly its commander-in-chief and Junta member, Admiral Jorge Anaya, was the main architect and supporter of a military solution to resolve the long-standing claim of sovereignty over the islands. By 1982 the country was already in the midst of a devastating economic crisis and large-scale civil unrest against the repressive government and Anaya, now a member of the ruling Junta, ordered Operation Rosario to be brought forward to 2 April, after a group of Argentina military infiltrated a group of Argentine scrap metal merchants and raised the Argentine flag at South Georgia 19 March.

General Galtieri, acting president, agreed in his intention to mount a quick, symbolic occupation, followed rapidly by a withdrawal, leaving only a small garrison to support the new military governor and force the UK to begin talks on the long-delayed sovereignty claim.  On 2 April an amphibious landing was made at Stanley and on 3 April Argentine marines used helicopters to take over the Georgias.  Whilst the military junta was redeploying the assault units back to their home bases they found the British responded with a large-scale mobilisation to organise a naval task force and ground forces to retake the islands by force.

The war could not have happened at a worse time for the Argentines. They were expecting new destroyers, frigates and submarines being built in West Germany and their shipment of French Super Étendards and Exocets were not yet complete.

Argentine Navy

Operation Rosario (2 April)

Vice Admiral Juan José Lombardo

Task Group 20
Commander José Sarcona (covering force)
 ARA Veinticinco de Mayo – a  
  – a 
 ARA Comodoro Seguí – an 
 ARA Hipólito Bouchard – an Allen M. Sumner-class destroyer
 ARA Piedrabuena – an Allen M. Sumner-class destroyer
  – fleet tanker

Task Group 40
Rear Admiral Jorge Allara (amphibious force)

  – Argentine-built Type 42 destroyer (flagship)
  – Argentine-built De Soto County-class LST, an amphibious landing ship
  –  Type 42 destroyer
  – a 
  – a Drummond-class corvette
  – icebreaker
  – A , GUPPY program submarine
  – supply ship

South Georgia (3 April)

  – a Drummond-class corvette (†1)
  – Antarctic survey ship. A polar transport, later deployed as hospital ship off Stanley. Bahía Paraíso transported Argentine forces from Corbeta Uruguay base to South Georgia in the events preceding the Falklands War.

Falklands Theatre of Operations [Teatro de Operaciones Malvinas] (2 April–14 June)

(†8)
 , a Sotoyomo-class patrol vessel. During the war the British claimed to have sunk Comodoro Somellera with a Sea Skua. This claim was subsequently dropped when the British evaluated wartime reports after the war.  The ship continued to serve in the Argentine navy until 1998 when she sank in the port of Ushuaia during a storm following a collision with ARA Suboficial Castillo.
(†22)
  –  a transport ship, Bahía Buen Suceso transported Constantino Davidoff's party to South Georgia precipitating the Falklands War. She was moved from Stanley to the Falklands Sound on 29 April. During the trip, the ship spotted the schooner Penelope, property of the FIC, which was taken over by an Argentine prize crew the following day. While at anchor at Fox Bay, the transport ran aground in a storm and was later damaged by 30 mm ADEN cannon fire from BAe Sea Harrier FRS.Mk.1s. The British eventually captured the hull after the war and sank her in high seas.

South Atlantic Theatre of Operations [Teatro de Operaciones del Atlántico Sur] (15 April–14 June)

Direct control from Puerto Belgrano Naval Base, Buenos Aires Province.
Vice Admiral Juan Lombardo

Task Group 79.1
Rear Admiral Jorge Allara
 ARA Veinticinco de Mayo – The threat of submarine attacks kept the carrier confined to port after 3 May.
 ARA Hércules –  Type 42 destroyer.
 ARA Santísima Trinidad – Type 42 destroyer.
  – a fleet tanker.

Task Group 79.3

Captain Héctor Bonzo
(†323)
 ARA Hipólito Bouchard – destroyer
 ARA Piedrabuena – destroyer
  – fleet tanker

Task Group 79.4
Captain Juan Calmon
 ARA Drummond – corvette
 ARA Guerrico – corvette
 ARA Granville – corvette

Submarine force

  – A Type 209 submarine.
(†1)

Others
ARA Almirante Irízar – (acting as hospital ship)
 ARA Francisco de Gurruchaga – a patrol ship.

Argentine Coast Guard
Stationed at the Falklands Naval Station.
She was captured at Stanley by the British on 14 June 1982 and renamed .
 Río Iguazú – A Z-28 type naval patrol craft, strafed and damaged by BAe Sea Harrier FRS.Mk.1s on 22 May in Choiseul Sound while steaming towards Goose Green with two 105 mm guns aboard, beached in Button Bay. The guns were recovered by divers from the Argentine Army and taken off by helicopter, though one was damaged, and were used in the defence of Darwin. Later captured by British Forces, but attacked by a Westland Lynx HAS.Mk.2/3 (XZ691) from  firing a Sea Skua on 13 June 1982. The wreck was towed to Goose Green after the conflict. (†1)

Argentine Merchant Navy

Blockade runners

 Formosa – A 12,762-ton ELMA cargo ship, attacked by Argentine Douglas A-4 Skyhawks of Grupo 5 by mistake. She was hit by an unexploded 1,000 lb bomb and strafed while bound for Rio Gallegos. Survived the conflict.
 Río Carcarañá – An ELMA cargo ship, 8,500 tons, damaged by Sea Harriers in Port King. Subsequently, attacked by both sides, until finally sunk by Sea Skua missiles fired from a Westland Lynx helicopter on 23 May 1982.
 Yehuín – A requisitioned oil tender, 494 tons, from the Geomater company. Captured 15 June 1982 and renamed Falkland Sound. Sold to a British owner from London in 1991, then transferred to several Panamanian companies. Returned to Argentine control as Audax II when bought by Cintra company in 2008, and under Uruguayan registry since 2011
 Río Cincel – An ELMA cargo ship. Survived the conflict.
 Mar del Norte – A cargo ship from La Naviera company. Survived the conflict.
 Lago Argentino – An ELMA cargo ship. Survived the conflict.
 Puerto Rosales – A commercial tanker from YPF. Survived the conflict.

Spy trawlers
 : Owned by Compañía Sudamericana de Pesca y Exportación from Bahía Blanca. A 1,300-ton stern fishing freezer trawler. On patrol northwest of the exclusion zone since 26 April. Under the command of Lt. Cdr. Juan Carlos González Llanos. The civilian skipper was Captain Nestor Leonardo Fabiano. She made a number of visual contacts with British aircraft and warships, including a submarine, according to the Argentine version. Damaged by an unexploded 1,000 lb. bomb and 30 mm ADEN cannon fire from two BAe Sea Harrier FRS.Mk.1s of 800 Naval Air Squadron, . A member of the crew, sailor Omar Alberto Rupp, was killed. She was later captured by Royal Marines on 9 May 1982.
 María Alejandra: Owned by Inda hnos. from Mar del Plata. On patrol northwest of the exclusion zone from 26 April to 4 May. She assisted the disabled ARA Alférez Sobral to reach Puerto Deseado. Maria Alejandra also acted as a radio link between the ill-fated Narwal and the mainland.
 Constanza: Owned by Arpemar from Mar del Plata. On patrol northwest of the exclusion zone from 26 April to 4 May.
 Invierno: Owned by Arpemar from Mar del Plata. On patrol northwest of the exclusion zone from 5 to 9 May.
 Capitán Canepa: Based at Mar del Plata. From the government fishery agency SEIM.
 María Luisa: Based at Mar del Plata. Spotted a British warship on 26 April, shortly after being overflown by a fighter jet. This revealed to the Argentine intelligence the path of the British battle group. Part of a three-trawler flotilla that intercepted supply vessel  on 29 April at the position .  On 30 April she returned to Mar del Plata due to mechanical problems.
 Usurbil: Based at Buenos Aires. Under the command of Lt. Cdr. Fernando Pedro Amorena. The civilian skipper was Captain Adolfo Antonio Arbelo from Mar del Plata. Fifty per cent of her crew was Spanish. Part of a three-trawler flotilla that intercepted supply vessel RFA Fort Grange on 29 April at the position . She made radar contact with six ships sailing in convoy on 8 May. Warned off by a warship and a helicopter, she returned to Buenos Aires.
 Mar Azul: Based at Mar del Plata. Part of a three-trawler flotilla that intercepted supply vessel RFA Fort Grange on 29 April at the position . She tracked the 8 May convoy by radar along with Usurbil, but was ordered to return to Mar del Plata on 9 May before making visual contact.
 Río de la Plata II: An ELMA cargo vessel of 10,409 tons. Spotted by British off Ascension Island and warned off on 24 April 1982. The most successful Argentine spy ship; she collected valuable intelligence about the type of warships, logistic craft and merchantmen deployed by the British to the south.

Falkland Islands Company ships seized by the Argentine Navy

 Forrest – armed coaster: She fought off the Lynx helicopter that put the patrol craft Islas Malvinas out of action near Kidney Island on 1 May. The aircraft came back to HMS Alacrity with serious damage from small arms fire. The ship rescued two survivors of the crew of ARA Isla de los Estados, sunk by Alacrity on 10 May. She towed ARA Monsunen to Darwin later in the war, after this ship faced the attack of two British frigates and a helicopter. She uploaded ARA Monsunens cargo and completed the supply mission to Stanley on 25 May. The ship was involved in harbour duties until the end of the war.
 Monsunen – armed coaster: She survived the attack of two British frigates and a helicopter, successfully avoiding them by running aground at Seal Cove. Her supply mission was eventually carried out by ARA Forrest, which towed her to Darwin. Recovered by British forces on 29 May, after the battle of Goose Green.
 Penelope – schooner: Spotted by ARA Bahía Buen Suceso at Speedwell Island and seized by an Argentine prize crew on 7 May. She accomplished a logistic mission from Fox Bay to Stanley. She eventually reached Stanley on 2 June.

See also 
 Argentine air forces in the Falklands War
 Argentine ground forces in the Falklands War
 List of ships of the Argentine Navy

Notes

References
 Falklands Air War, Chris Hobson. 
 Amphibious Assault Falklands, Michael Clapp and Ewen Southby – Tailyour. 
 No Vencidos, Horacio Mayorga, 1998.  
 Guerra bajo la Cruz del Sur, Eduardo José Costa, 1988.  
 Los viajes del Penélope. La historia del barco más viejo de la Guerra de Malvinas, Roberto Herrscher, 2007.  

Military units and formations of Argentina in the Falklands War
Naval forces in the Falklands War
Falklands War orders of battle